Juan Bustabad (born August 16, 1961) is a minor league baseball player and manager.

Playing career
Bustabad was a shortstop during his playing career. He graduated from Hialeah-Miami Lakes High School and attended Miami-Dade College. He was drafted by the Boston Red Sox in the 1st round of the 1980 MLB amateur player draft.

He began his professional career with the Winter Haven Red Sox in Single-A in 1980 and played in Boston's farm system through 1985, making stops in Bristol, Pawtucket and  New Britain. He was signed by the Los Angeles Dodgers as a minor league free agent prior to the 1986 season and spent 2½ seasons with the Double-A San Antonio Dodgers/Missions and half a season with Triple-A Albuquerque.

In 9 seasons of minor league baseball, he played in 1,002 games, finishing with a batting average of .247.

Coaching career
1990: Coach – Yakima Bears
1991: Manager – Indios de Charallave
1992: Roving Infield Coach – Los Angeles Dodgers minor league system
1993: Coach – Lethbridge Mounties
1994–1996: Manager – Gulf Coast Marlins
1997: Manager – Utica Blue Sox
1998: Manager – Kane County Cougars
1999: Hitting Coach – Brevard County Manatees
2000: Manager – Great Falls Dodgers
2001: Manager – Gulf Coast Dodgers
2002: Manager – Vero Beach Dodgers
2003: Hitting Coach – Ogden Raptors
2004: Hitting Coach – Vero Beach Dodgers
2005: Manager – Ogden Raptors
2006–2007: Manager – Gulf Coast Dodgers
2008–2010: Manager – Great Lakes Loons
2011–2012: Manager – Rancho Cucamonga Quakes

He won his 700th career game as a manager on August 24, 2010 when the Great Lakes Loons beat the West Michigan Whitecaps 9-3. The win was on the same day that he was named the Midwest League Manager of the Year.

He was selected as the California League manager of the year in 2011 with the Rancho Cucamonga Quakes.

References

External links

Living people
Miami Dade Sharks baseball players
Winter Haven Red Sox players
Bristol Red Sox players
Pawtucket Red Sox players
New Britain Red Sox players
San Antonio Dodgers players
San Antonio Missions players
Albuquerque Dukes players
Minor league baseball managers
1961 births
Hialeah-Miami Lakes Senior High School alumni